Anne Antoine Jules de Clermont-Tonnerre (1 January 1749–21 February 1830) was a French prelate of the Catholic Church. He was made a cardinal by Pope Pius VII in 1822.

Life
He became Bishop of Châlons-sur-Marne in 1782. He was consecrated as bishop on 14 April 1782. He resigned as ordered by Pope Pius VII. He was a member of the states-general in 1789. 

He took refuge in Brussels and Holland, while both his parents were guillotined in Paris. After the return of the Louis XVIII to the French throne, he was named a Peer of France and named to the new Diocese of Châlons–that of Châlons-sur-Marne was lost in the reorganization of that year–in 1817 but failure of the National Assembly to ratify the new Concordat between France and the Papacy. 

He was named Archbishop of Toulouse on 28 August 1820 and a cardinal on 2 December 1822. He participated in the papal conclaves of 1823 and 1829.

He died in Toulouse on 21 February 1830.

References

18th-century peers of France
Members of the Chamber of Peers of the Bourbon Restoration
1749 births
1830 deaths
18th-century French Roman Catholic bishops
Archbishops of Toulouse
19th-century French cardinals
Cardinals created by Pope Pius VII
Dukes of Clermont-Tonnerre